Dominique Heintz (born 15 August 1993) is a German professional footballer who plays as a centre back for Bundesliga club VfL Bochum, on loan from Union Berlin.

Career
On 28 April 2018, Heintz played as Köln lost 3–2 to SC Freiburg which confirmed the club's relegation from the Bundesliga.

In May 2018, SC Freiburg announced Heintz would join the club for the 2018–19 season. The transfer fee paid to Köln was reported as €3 million.

On 21 December 2021, it was announced that Heintz would join Union Berlin in January 2022 when the transfer window opened.

References

External links
 
 

1993 births
Living people
People from Neustadt an der Weinstraße
Association football central defenders
German footballers
Germany youth international footballers
Germany under-21 international footballers
1. FC Kaiserslautern II players
1. FC Kaiserslautern players
1. FC Köln players
SC Freiburg players
1. FC Union Berlin players
VfL Bochum players
Bundesliga players
2. Bundesliga players
Footballers from Rhineland-Palatinate